Verkhny Tyukun (Ürge Tökön) is a rural locality (a village) in Kamyshlinsky Selsoviet, Karmaskalinsky District, Bashkortostan, Russia. The population was 240 as of 2010. There are 5 streets.

Geography 
Verkhny Tyukun is located 29 km southeast of Karmaskaly (the district's administrative centre) by road. Tyukun is the nearest rural locality.

References 

Rural localities in Karmaskalinsky District